Robert Mark Marciano (born June 25, 1968) is an American journalist and meteorologist who is currently employed by ABC News. Marciano provides forecasts for the weekend editions of Good Morning America, a position Ginger Zee vacated when she was chosen to succeed Sam Champion on the daily editions of GMA.

Marciano first gained prominence as a meteorologist and occasional reporter and substitute anchor for CNN Worldwide in their Atlanta headquarters.

Prior to his employment by ABC, Marciano was most recently employed by Entertainment Tonight, where he co-anchored the nightly thirty-minute edition of the program as well as the sixty-minute weekend edition. He left ET in late August 2014 after twenty months to take his current position with ABC.

Background
Marciano was born in Glenville, Connecticut, and received a bachelor's degree in meteorology from Cornell University. He holds the American Meteorological Society Seal of Approval and is a Certified Broadcast Meteorologist (CBM). He is of Italian and German ancestry.

Career
Before joining CNN in May 2003, he served as chief meteorologist for KATU-TV and 750 KXL News Radio in Portland, Oregon. From 1994 to 1997, he worked as morning and then chief meteorologist for KPLC-TV in Lake Charles, Louisiana and later served as a weather anchor for WVIT Connecticut News 30 in West Hartford, Connecticut.

On November 12, 2012, Marciano was announced as a new co-anchor for Entertainment Tonight, which he would begin doing in January 2013. The choice followed a long search period for a new co-anchor to host the program with Nancy O'Dell, a search that began when Mark Steines left the series after eight years as the primary co-anchor. Marciano bid farewell to CNN viewers on Early Start and Starting Point on December 21, 2012.

On July 19, 2014, ABC News announced that Marciano would become the network's senior meteorologist. He has since joined Good Morning America Weekend and reports on the latest weather headlines throughout the week as well as partners with Ginger Zee and the Extreme Weather Team for weather coverage across all ABC News broadcasts and platforms. His final co-hosting of Entertainment Tonight came on Wednesday, August 27, 2014. He debuted on GMA on Saturday, September 6, 2014.

Personal life
Marciano is an avid outdoorsman and major sports fan. He has been married to his wife, Eryn since 2010. However they are divorcing as of July 2022. Together they have one daughter, Madelynn, and one son, Mason.

References

External links
 

1968 births
Living people
ABC News personalities
American infotainers
American male journalists
American people of German descent
American people of Italian descent
American television hosts
American television meteorologists
CNN people
Cornell University College of Agriculture and Life Sciences alumni
Journalists from Connecticut
People from Greenwich, Connecticut